Felipe Armas (1902 - death date unknown) was a Cuban baseball pitcher in the Negro leagues. He played with the Cuban Stars (West) in 1925.

References

External links
 and  Seamheads 

1902 births
Year of death missing
Cuban Stars (West) players
Baseball pitchers
Cuban expatriate baseball players in the United States
Sportspeople from Matanzas